Phosphaticola is a genus of moths in the family Cosmopterigidae. It contains only one species, Phosphaticola gemmatella, which is found in Tunisia.

The wingspan is 11–12 mm. Adults have been recorded in February.

References
Natural History Museum Lepidoptera genus database

Antequerinae
Monotypic moth genera
Endemic fauna of Tunisia
Moths of Africa
Taxa named by Pierre Viette